Encholirium horridum is a xerophytic bromeliad native to the states of Minas Gerais and Espírito Santo in eastern Brazil.

References

Pitcairnioideae
Endemic flora of Brazil
Plants described in 1940